G-Force: Guardians of Space (1986) is the second American animated television adaptation of the Japanese anime series Science Ninja Team Gatchaman (1972), following Sandy Frank Entertainment's initial 1978 effort Battle of the Planets and preceding ADV Films' 2005 attempt, known merely as Gatchaman. With G-Force, Sandy Frank Entertainment collaborated with Turner Broadcasting to create a newer, more faithful translation of Science Ninja Team Gatchaman for a new audience, and such a translation was made possible with the relaxed television standards of the 1980s, a luxury that the more Star Wars-themed Battle of the Planets did not enjoy.

In the show, five brave teenagers — Ace Goodheart, Dirk Daring, Agatha June, Pee Wee and Hoot Owl battle the aliens Galactor and Computor for the fate of the planet Earth.

Overview 
 
During the early-to-mid 1980s, Sandy Frank Entertainment's Battle of the Planets (or BotP) was gradually being phased off the air after a successful number of years in syndication. Television stations began relegating the show to early morning timeslots (as typically done with programming on its way off the air) before dispensing of it altogether. During this period Ted Turner's cable network TBS (then known as "SuperStation WTBS") also aired the show on their channel (albeit in a slightly more edited form, with cuts for time constraints), and by 1984, WTBS was more or less the exclusive home of BotP before they too dispensed of it around 1985, effectively ending the lengthy run of Battle of the Planets on U.S television.

With Battle of the Planets having run its course, Sandy Frank, still holding the domestic rights to the first Gatchaman series, continued to market BotP wherever they could while seeking ways to continue making use of their license. Interest came from the part of Turner Broadcasting (who was the last to air BotP on a wide scale on their TBS network) in creating a newer, more faithful adaptation of Gatchaman, which would be easier to accomplish with the newly relaxed television standards of the Reagan era-1980s. (Themes such as violence, death and destruction in cartoons were heavily edited during the 1970s.) Turner executives believed that the series still had potential, and in turn acquired the rights from Sandy Frank to begin work on what would come to be known as G-Force (the same title given to the collective group of protagonists in Battle of the Planets, which in turn would be used for the same purpose on the new version).

To develop this project, Turner enlisted the help of Fred Ladd, a pioneer in the field of translating and distributing Japanese animation in the U.S (with famous works such as Astro Boy, Gigantor & Kimba the White Lion, under his belt) to produce the adaptation. Ladd had previously been offered to produce Battle of the Planets by Sandy Frank himself a few years before, but passed on the offer due to location conflicts; Ladd was working out of New York City at the time, while BotP was being produced in California. Ladd, through his production company "Sparklin' Entertainment", put together two "test" pilot episodes chosen by Turner (see Episode order), and sent them in for approval. Within days, Ladd and his company were given the greenlight to produce the adaptation, and work on G-Force began in the fall of 1986. Despite it being handled by Turner & Fred Ladd, Sandy Frank ultimately held the copyrights to the show (along with international distribution rights), while Turner, through its subsidiary Turner Program Services, and King Features Entertainment (a subsidiary of Hearst Corporation; now Hearst Communications) held limited distribution and syndication rights.

Changes and additions in the adaptation

Content editing 
For Turner's G-Force, none of Battle of the Planets original elements (such as 7-Zark-7, 1-Rover-1, the concept of space travel and space battles and all of the added American footage) were retained, preferably replaced with a more accurate translation of the original Gatchaman series with far fewer alterations. Most of the plot, backstories, violence and deaths remained intact, only edited or "softened" with added dialogue where it was too explicit (i.e., certain on-screen gun usage, deaths via firearms and/or overly violent means and inter-team violence).

 Music 
An all-new music score was composed (by composer Dean Andre) for G-Force. The score retained some of the original, 1970s Gatchaman score.

The silent parts of the Gatchaman soundtrack were filled in with additional music, also composed by Dean Andre.  This was a relatively common practice, purportedly to maintain the pace of the show and prevent the audience from losing interest during a lull in action. Battle of the Planets had used this practice, composing new scores as well as reusing the existing Gatchaman music, during silent moments such as mecha transformations (which originally had a high-pitched warping sound effect synchronized with the light beams) and the completely musicless scenes where Katse talked with Sosai X. G-Force: Guardians of Space opted to use a sole, repetitive synth instrumental that would play on and off as the Gatchaman score faded in and out. This synth instrumental is actually a stripped-down rendition of the show's opening/ending theme and is played throughout every episode of the series.

 Episode order 
Unlike Battle of the Planets, which bounced around the Gatchaman episode order and adapted them as the producers saw fit, G-Force followed the original Gatchaman episode order for its entire run, only skipping Gatchaman episodes 81 (due to intense content, also skipped in BotP) and 86 (for unknown reasons) for a total of 85 dubbed episodes (the same number of episodes adapted for Battle of the Planets coincidentally). The final 18 episodes of Gatchaman (episodes 88-105) were not adapted for G-Force either, which resulted in this adaptation lacking a proper conclusion. The reasons behind this decision are not exactly known; some sources claim that only 85 episodes were contracted and bought for this adaptation while others claim that budget constraints or lack of interest in adapting the remaining episodes cut it short. Also to be taken into consideration is the fact that the Gatchaman series became increasingly darker and violent towards its end, which would have made adapting those last episodes difficult, given that G-Force was being marketed towards children. It was not until ADV Films' uncut and unedited release of the first Gatchaman series in 2005-2006 that all 105 episodes were adapted and available in English.

Episodes 18 ("The Whale Submarine") and 87 ("Galactor's Deadly Trap") of G-Force served as the two pilots for the show. They were put together by producer Fred Ladd before he had been given approval to work on the rest of the series, with the purpose being to demonstrate (to Turner Broadcasting) what his work on the show would look and sound like. The two pilots are unique amongst the rest of the episodes for having replaced all of the original Gatchaman music with new music composed by Dean Andre, which was part of the proposed, all-new music score for the show. Due to time constraints, the new pieces of music weren't utilized beyond the pilots and left on the cutting room floor, with the rest of the episodes retaining most of the original Gatchaman score. Incidentally, most of the new music that was exclusively played in the pilots also turned out to be variations of the show's opening/ending theme. There exist earlier, unaired versions of the pilot episodes which contain a radically different music score than even the broadcast versions of the pilots. They also contain an unused opening/closing theme, which along with the aforementioned score was also left on the cutting room floor in favor of the final music selection present in the broadcast episodes. These "pre-production" pilot episodes are only available as extras on the Region 4 (PAL) Battle of the Planets: Collection 2 DVD set.

Between the efforts of both Battle of the Planets and G-Force, 99 of Gatchaman'''s 105 episodes were adapted. Incidentally, the last six untranslated episodes were very crucial to the series' overall storyline, serving as the series's finale. They also featured some of the series' most violent, yet memorable moments. As previously mentioned, ADV Film's uncut Gatchaman release finally adapted all 105 episodes into English, more than 30 years after the show first aired and almost 30 years since its first English adaptation.

 Character names and terms 

On the creative side, the original Gatchaman character names and terms were once-again re-tooled and Americanized in G-Force for the convenience of the English-speaking market, as they first were with Battle of the Planets years earlier. Despite the existence of BotP's set of English names and terms, G-Forces producers came up with their own set in an attempt to stray away from the previous adaptation as much as possible and avoid any potential confusion between the two. From Battle of the Planets to G-Force, the heroes' names were changed to Ace Goodheart (Mark), Dirk Daring (Jason), Agatha June (Princess), Pee Wee (Keyop), Hoot Owl (Tiny), and Dr. Brighthead (Chief Anderson), while the main villains were renamed Galactor (Zoltar) and Computor (The Great Spirit) respectively. The only terms retained from BotP were the name of the group as a collective ("G-Force", in order to explain the "G" on their costumes and vehicles) and the team's ship ("Phoenix").

 Other changes 
 In G-Force, the Pee Wee character remained mostly identical to his original Gatchaman counterpart Jinpei, as opposed to Battle of the Planets which drastically altered the Jinpei character from a typical 10-year-old to Keyop, an engineered lifeform with a speech impediment.

 In Gatchaman and Battle of the Planets, the two primary antagonists (known as Berg Katse/Zoltar & Sosai X/The Great Spirit respectively) shared a strictly subordinate/master relationship, which was changed to more of a master/consultant relationship in G-Force, with Galactor (Berg Katse) becoming the master and Computor (Sosai X) now relegated to his consultant. The reasons for this change is due to religious-based criticism disapproving of "The Great Spirit" role that Sosai X had in Battle of the Planets. Scenes with Sosai X were reduced, including ones with Galactor (Katse) bowing to Sosai X.
 Unlike its Gatchaman and Battle of the Planets brethren, G-Force did not have title cards at the beginning of its episodes which made following the show and its individual episodes quite difficult. Foreign-language dubs of G-Force attempted to correct this oversight by having the narrator announce the episode title at the start of each episode. Also, episodes which were listed and titled as two-parters in Gatchaman and Battle of the Planets were not titled as such in G-Force, but the plots in those episodes remained more or less intact. The show's episode titles were later revealed and available to the masses via fan clubs and the Internet.

 Credits 
Owned and distributed by: Sandy Frank Entertainment (formerly marketed by Turner Program Services and King Features Entertainment, whose rights reverted to Sandy Frank in 2003)

Producer: Fred Ladd

Voice Director: Fred Ladd

Additional Music Composer/Music Editor: Dean Andre

Post-Production: Bruce Austin Productions

Videotape Editor: Kurt Tiegs

Production: Sparklin' Entertainment

 Voice cast
Ace Goodheart: Sam Fontana

Dirk Daring/Red Impulse: Cam Clarke (all episodes except 39 & 40)

Agatha June/Pee Wee: Barbara Goodson

Hoot-Owl/Dr.Brighthead/Computor: Jan Rabson (some episodes), Gregg Berger (others)

Galactor: Bill Capizzi

Opening Credits Announcer: Norm Prescott

(NOTE: The show's voice actors were originally uncredited in its credits list.)

 Team variations across different versions 
The renaming of the various characters and terms in G-Force are highlighted as follows (in correspondence to their Gatchaman equivalents, among others):

 Although he was obviously the Swallow, Jimmy called himself the Falcon.

 Other character variations across different versions 

 Identity change variations across different versions 

‡The original Japanese language version of Gatchaman contains a small amount of words in English.

 Episode list 
 The Robot Stegosaur (#1. Gatchaman vs. Turtle King)
 The Blast at the Bottom of the Sea (#2. The Evil Ghostly Aircraft Carrier)
 The Strange White Shadow (#3. The Giant Mummy that Calls Storms)
 The Giant Centipoid (#4. Revenge of the Iron Beast Mechadegon)
 The Phantom Fleet (#5. Ghost Fleet from Hell)
 The Micro-Robots (#6. The Great Mini Robot Operation)
 The Bad Blue Baron (#7. Galactor's Great Airshow)
 The Secret of the Reef (#8. The Secret of the Crescent Coral Reef)
 The Sting of the Scorpion (#9. The Devil from the Moon)
 The Antoid Army (#10. The Great Underground Monster War)
 The Mighty Blue Hawk (#11. The Mysterious Red Impulse)
 The Locustoid (#12. The Giant Eating Monster Ibukuron)
 The Deadly Red Sand (#13. Mystery of the Red Sand)
 The Rainbow Ray (#14. Fearful Ice-Kander)
 The Giant Jellyfish Lens (#15. The Frightening Jellyfish Lens)
 The Regenerating Robot (#16. Mechanica, the Indestructible Machine)
 The Beetle Booster (#17. Great Insect Operation)
 The Whale Submarine (Pilot Episode #1) (#18. Revenge! The Whale Operation)
 The Racing Inferno (#19. Hell's Speed Race)
 The Mightiest Mole (#20. A Critical Moment for the Science Ninja Team)
 Race of the Cyborgs (#21. Who is Leader X?)
 The Fiery Dragon (#22. Firebird vs. Fire Eating Dragon)
 The Mammoth Iron Ball (#23. Giant Raging Mecha Ball)
 The Neon Giant (#24. A Neon Giant Laughs in the Dark)
 The Rock Robot (#25. Magma Giant, The Emperor of Hell)
 The Secret Sting Ray (#26. The Godphoenix Reborn) (A pilot was produced from this episode by Media360, originally titled "The Zol Indtruders", and featured Georgia-based actors)
 The ANIrobot (#27. Galactor's Witch Racer)
 Invisible Enemy (#28. The Invisible Demon)
 The Project Called "Rock-E-X" (#29. Galack X, The Devil-Man)
 The Attack of the Mantis (#30. Kamisoral, the Guillotine Iron Beast)
 The Sinister STAR-ONE (#31. Plan to Assassinate Dr. Nambu)
 The Giant Squid (#32. The Gezora Operation, Part 1)
 In The Tentacles' Grip (#33. The Gezora Operation, Part 2)
 Operation Aurora (#34. Evil Aurora Operation)
 The Sun-Bird (#35. Fires of the Blazing Desert)
 The Deadly Sea (#36. Little Gatchaman)
 The Particle Beam (#37. Renjira, the Electron Iron Beast)
 The Dinosaur Man (#38. The Mysterious Mechanical Jungle)
 The Monster Plants (#39. Jigokiller, the People-Eating Plant, Part 1)
 Those Fatal Flowers (#40. Jigokiller, the People-Eating Plant, Part 2)
 Killer Music (#41. Murder Music)
 Swan Song Prison (#42. The Great Escape Trick)
 Human Robots (#43. A Romance Destroyed By Evil)
 The Shock Waves (#44. A Challenge From Galactor)
 The Case of the Kalanite (#45. The Sea Lion Ninja Team in the Night Fog)
 The Deadly Valley (#46. Gatchaman in the Valley of Death)
 The Super-z-20 (#47. The Devil's Airline)
 The Camera Weapon (#48. Shutterkiller, the Camera Iron Beast)
 The Mechanical Fang (#49. The Terrifying Mechadokuga)
 The Skeleton Curse (#50. Tracodon, the Dinosaur Skeleton)
 Wheel of Destruction (#51. Cataroller, the Rolling Monster)
 The Secret Red Impulse (#52. Red Impulse's Secret)
 The Van Allen Vector (#53. Farewell, Red Impulse)
 The Vengeance (#54. Gatchaman Burns With Rage)
 The Micro-Submarine (#55. The Desperate Mini-Submarine)
 The Bird Missile (#56. Bitter Bird Missile)
 Battle of the North Pole (#57. The Evil White Sea)
 The Super-Lazer (#58. Hell's Mecha-Buddha)
 Mystery of the Haunted Island (#59. Secret of the Monster Mecha Factory)
 G-Force Agent 6 (#60. Science Ninja Team G-6)
 Dream of Danger (#61. The Ghost of Red Impulse)
 The Snow Devil (#62. Blizzarder, the Snow Devil)
 The Strange Strike-Out (#63. Massacre of the Mecha Curve Ball)
 A Deadly Gift (#64. A Deadly Christmas Present)
 The Iron Beast (#65. Super BEM, the Synthetic Iron Beast)
 When Fashion Was Fatal (#66. The Devil's Fashion Show)
 The Proto Monster (#67. Mortal Blow! The Gatchaman Fire)
 Radioactive Island (#68. Particle Iron Beast, Micro Saturn)
 The Devil's Graveyard (#69. Cemetery Under the Moonlight)
 Mummy Mania (#70. Uniting Goddesses of Death)
 The Abominable Snowman Cometh (#71. The Immortal Leader X)
 Plague of Robots (#72. The Swarm! Attack of the Mini Monstermechs)
 The Mammothodon (#73. Get Katse!)
 Secret of the Power (#74. The Secret of the Bird Styles)
 The Crab Robot (#75. Jumbo Shakora, the Sea Devil)
 The Reverser Ray (#76. The Bracelet Is Exposed)
 Shock Waves (#77 Berg Katse's Success)
 Battle on the Ocean Bottom (#78. Deadly Danger! 10,000 Meters Beneath the Sea)
 Stolen Identity (#79. Gatchaman Secrets Stolen)
 The Mind-Control Machine (#80. Return! Boomerang)
 Force of the Mega-Robots (#82. Aim for Crescent Coral Reef!)
 The Flame Zone (#83. A Desperate Ring of Fire)
 Web of Danger (#84. Smog Fiber, Spiderweb Iron Beast)
 The Secret of G-4  (#85. He's G-4!)
 Galactor's Deadly Trap (Pilot Episode #2) (#87. Patogiller, the Triple United Iron Beast)

 Debut and reception 
 TBS run (1986) 
The revamped G-Force premiered in obscurity on Turner's WTBS network in July 1987 and ran for just a week before mysteriously disappearing afterwards.

The reasons for this brief airing are still unknown. Sources indicate that the purpose behind the WTBS "test run" was to clear a contractual agreement that allowed the rights-holders to list the show as having "aired" in the United States to aid its international syndication sales.G-Force was syndicated internationally in the following years, while the U.S. was left without any incarnation of Gatchaman for eight years.

 Cartoon Network run (1995–1997; 2000; 2004) 
During the early 1990's, Cartoon Network, another of Ted Turner's networks, was in need of newer programming. Coupled with the runaway success of Mighty Morphin Power Rangers around the same time, this provided an opportunity for G-Force to make its proper U.S. debut as Turner Program Services still held syndication rights to the series. G-Force premiered on Cartoon Network on January 2, 1995 alongside James Bond Jr as the newest additions to the channel's Super Adventures programming block. All 85 episodes of the series were finally aired on weekday and weekend rotation.G-Force was the first anime to air on Cartoon Network, followed later that month by Robot Carnival, Vampire Hunter D, Twilight of the Cockroaches (January 29, 1995). Along with Speed Racer (February 1996), these early entries paved the way for Cartoon Network's Toonami (March 1997) which popularized anime on the channel.

The show performed modestly, but it most notably faced backlash from returning fans of the previous adaptation, Battle of the Planets. The recycling of the same team name and episode content confused older fans who were unaware that a newer English translation of Gatchaman had been produced after Battle of the Planets mid-1980s hiatus.

By early 1996, Cartoon Network shifted G-Force to late night and weekend airings, where it lingered until it re-ran its last episode on Saturday, July 12, 1997. The following weekend, the show (then airing during the last remnant of the network's Super Adventures block) was canceled to make way for a Saturday evening edition of Toonami.

G-Force made brief re-appearances in 2000 (on Cartoon Network's late-night "Toonami Midnight Run" block) and again in 2004 (on ADV's "The Anime Network"), never airing more than a handful of episodes after its 1995-1997 Cartoon Network run.

During its short stint on the weekend "Toonami Midnight Run" block in early 2000, G-Force was featured in a number of on-air promotions for Cartoon Network's Toonami, which continued to air even after the show was canceled from the block.

 DVD releases and availability 
Due to its relative obscurity, and paired with the fact that ADV's recent uncut and unedited Gatchaman release has replaced it as the most accurate English adaptation, G-Force is unlikely to receive a full series or boxset release as its Battle of the Planets brethren has received (in the U.K at least).

Sandy Frank Entertainment (which originally licensed both Battle of the Planets and G-Force: Guardians of Space) lost their distribution and marketing rights to the original Gatchaman series and its adaptations sometime in 2007. They have since been re-acquired by Sentai Filmworks, which has re-released the ADV Films English dub of Gatchaman on Blu-ray and DVD as well as Battle of the Planets on streaming platforms. While they hold the licensing rights to G-Force, they currently have no plans to re-release the show.

To date only a handful of G-Force episodes have been released on home video, totaling to just 13 of its 85 episodes when adding up all of the ones in the following DVD releases:
 The Best of G-Force (Region 1 NTSC DVD released on September 28, 2004): A compilation DVD by Rhino Entertainment Company (under its Rhinomation classic animation entertainment brand) featuring seven random G-Force episodes, all presented uncut, but mostly out of episode order.
 G-Force: Guardians of Space (Region 0 PAL DVD released on May 13, 2003): Eponymously titled DVD featuring the first three G-Force episodes.
 Battle of the Planets Volumes 1-6 (Region 1 NTSC DVDs released between 2001 and 2002): The first six volumes of Rhino's Battle of the Planets release contain one episode of G-Force per volume as "extras" (Episodes 1-6, in the same order as the respective volumes). After Volume 6 this practice was stopped.

 Further reading 
 G-Force: Animated
 Astro Boy and Anime Come to the Americas: An Insider's View of the Birth of a Pop Culture Phenomenon''

References

External links 
 
 

1986 American television series debuts
1986 American television series endings
1980s American animated television series
American children's animated action television series
American children's animated space adventure television series
American children's animated science fantasy television series
American children's animated superhero television series
Animated television series about extraterrestrial life
American television series based on Japanese television series
Gatchaman
Science fiction anime and manga
Tatsunoko Production
TBS (American TV channel) original programming
Teen animated television series÷
Teen superhero television series